The 2016 Piala Belia is the Sixth season of the Piala Belia since its establishment in 2008. The league is currently the youth level (U19) football league in Malaysia. Selangor FA are the defending champions.

Teams
The following teams will be participate in the 2016 Piala Belia. In order by the number given by FAM:-

   ATM FA
  Johor Darul Ta'zim F.C.
  Kedah FA
  Kelantan FA
  FELDA United F.C.
  Kuala Lumpur FA
  Melaka United
  MISC-MIFA
  Negeri Sembilan FA
  Pahang F.C.
  Perak FA
  Perlis FA
  Penang FA
  Sabah FA
  Sarawak FA
  Bukit Jalil Sports School
  SSMP U17
  SSMP U16
  Selangor FA
  Terengganu FA

Team summaries

Personnel and kits
Note: Flags indicate national team as has been defined under FIFA eligibility rules. Players and Managers may hold more than one non-FIFA nationality.

League table

Group A

Group B

Knock-out stage

Bracket

Quarterfinals

|}

First Leg

Second leg

Kelantan U19 won 1–0 on aggregate and advances to Semifinals

Selangor U19 won 1–0 on aggregate and advances to Semifinals

SSBJ U17 won 4–2 on Aggregate and advances to Semifinals

Kedah U19 won 3–2 on aggregate and advances to Semifinals

Semifinals

|}

First Leg

Second Leg

Selangor U19 won 3–1 on aggregate and advances to Final

SSBJ U17 won 2–1 on aggregate and advances to Final

Final

|}

First Leg

Second Leg

Winners with Aggregate result are Champions 2016 Piala Belia

Champions

Goalscorer

Top scorers

See also

 2016 Malaysia Super League
 2016 Malaysia Premier League
 2016 Malaysia FAM Cup
 2016 Malaysia FA Cup
 2016 Malaysia President's Cup

References

External links
 Football Association of Malaysia
 SPMB 

2016 in Malaysian football
Piala Belia